The Roma Holocaust Memorial Day (known with various slightly different names) is a memorial day that commemorates the victims of the Romani genocide (Porajmos), which resulted in the murder of an estimated  –  Romani people by Nazi Germany and its collaborators during World War II. The date of 2 August was chosen for the memorial because on the night of 2 – 3 August 1944,  Roma, mostly women, children and elderly people, were killed in the Gypsy family camp (Zigeunerfamilienlager) at Auschwitz concentration camp. Some countries have chosen to commemorate the genocide on different dates.

Establishment and commemoration 
In 2004 the Verkhovna Rada (the parliament of Ukraine) adopted a resolution on the commemoration of the International Remembrance Day of the Holocaust of the Roma.

In 2009 the Serbian Roma National Congress (Romski Nacionalni Savet) and the International Romani Union proposed the introduction of the Day of Remembrance of the Holocaust against the Roma/Porajmos.

In 2011 Poland established, by parliamentary resolution, the Genocide Remembrance Day of the Roma and Sinti (Dzień Pamięci o Zagładzie Romów i Sinti). Croatia, the Czech Republic, Lithuania, and Slovakia also observe 2 August as Roma and Sinti Genocide Remembrance Day.

The European Parliament on 15 April 2015, declared "that a European day should be dedicated to commemorating the victims of the genocide of the Roma during World War II and that this day should be called the European Roma Holocaust Memorial Day".

The Council of Europe also holds commemoration ceremonies.

Alternative dates 
Finland, Germany, Ireland, Italy, Latvia, Portugal, Slovenia, Spain and Sweden commemorate the Roma and Sinti genocide on 27 January, the International Holocaust Remembrance Day. The Czech Republic has four dates: 2 August 7 March, 13 May and 21 August. Latvia has three dates: 27 January 8 April and 8 May. 

In Serbia it is commemorated on 16 December, "in the memory of that date in 1942, when Himmler ordered the systematic deportation of Roma to concentration camps and their extermination".

References

External links 
 

International observances
August observances
Romani genocide
Holocaust remembrance days